Sadatabad (also Romanized as Sādātābād; also known as Dareh ‘Os̄mān, Darreh ‘Os̄mān, Darreh-ye ‘Os̄mān, Dar Sābān, Dar Sāpān, and Dār Uspān) is a village in Qolqol Rud Rural District, Qolqol Rud District, Tuyserkan County, Hamadan Province, Iran. At the 2006 census, its population was 73, in 21 families.

References 

Populated places in Tuyserkan County